Cargolux Flight 7933 was a cargo flight which was involved in a serious incident on 21 January 2010 in which it landed on a vehicle that was on an active runway. The vehicle suffered major damage while the aircraft had damage to a tire. Three investigations were launched into the incident, without a clear result.

Aircraft
The aircraft involved was a Boeing 747-4R7F (SCD) LX-OCV, c/n 29731, line number 1222. The aircraft first flew on 25 June 1999 and was delivered to Cargolux on 13 July 1999.

History
Flight 7933 departed Hong Kong International Airport on 20 January 2010 bound for Luxembourg Findel Airport via Heydar Aliyev International Airport, Baku, Azerbaijan and Barcelona–El Prat Airport, 
Barcelona, Spain. On the final leg, there were two crew and one passenger on board. On arrival at Luxembourg the aircraft was cleared to land on Findel Airport's runway 24. At 12:53 local time (11:53 UTC), one of the aircraft's tires 
came into contact with the roof of a van which was on the runway while maintenance of the runway lighting was performed. The driver of the van was shocked as a result of the collision. The van was severely damaged, with the roof pushed in and a lighting bar destroyed. A tyre on the aircraft was also damaged.

On 9 February 2010, disciplinary action was started against the controllers on duty at the time the incident occurred. The need for the van to be on the runway at a time of low visibility is also being investigated.

Investigation
Luxembourg's Ministry of transport stated that three investigations into the incident had been launched. It did not state whether the van had permission to be on the active runway or not. The investigations are being carried out by Luxembourg's Administration Des Enquêtes Techniques, Directorate of Civil Aviation and Administration of Air Navigation (AET). A preliminary report revealed that the van had been given permission to be on the active runway. The clearance had been issued before Flight 7933 started its approach. Flight 7933 also had permission to land on the runway that the van was on. Representatives from the NTSB and the Association Luxembourgeoise des Pilotes de Ligne assisted the AET in their investigation. The event was initially classed by the AET as an accident but was downgraded to a serious incident as the damage to the aircraft involved was not structural.

The AETs final report into the incident was released on 10 December 2012. The report revealed that the cause of the incident was errors by Air Traffic Control (ATC). The van had been instructed to vacate the runway but ATC had failed to confirm that the instruction had been received and executed before giving the aircraft permission to land. The van and aircraft were using different radio frequencies and therefore each was unaware of the other. A failure to use standard radio phraseology was found to have been a contributory factor in the incident. The van had been seen by the crew just before they landed but it was assessed that a collision would still have occurred had a go-around been initiated. Twelve recommendations were made in the AETs final report. These included the installation of equipment that was capable of recording ATC communications with at least the previous 24 hours recordings being retained.

See also

TAROM Flight 3107

References

Cargolux 7933
Aviation accidents and incidents in 2010
2010 in Luxembourg
Aviation accidents and incidents in Luxembourg
January 2010 events in Europe